Algert Gjonaj (born 18 October 1987) is an Albanian professional basketball player who plays for BC Vllaznia in the Albanian Basketball Superliga as well as the Albania national team.

References

1987 births
Living people
Albanian men's basketball players
Small forwards